Azteca Now (stylized: azteca Now) is a free-over-the-top streaming service owned by Icaro Media Group and operated by TV Azteca, was released on August 10, 2021, exclusively in several Latin American countries, United States, Canada and well as several European countries.

The platform was only released for Android and iOS, Includes a catalog of Original series, Telenovelas (from TV Azteca) as well as Movies from the Golden Age of Mexican Cinema, Original movies Lifestyle programs and including adn40 news programming. On November 16, 2022, it was launched for the Mexican market to compete mainly against TelevisaUnivision's Vix, and in the US market on January 17, 2023.

History 
At the beginning of 2021, TV Azteca would announce the launch of its streaming-platform in collaboration with the New York-based company Icaro Media Group to compete against Televisa's Blim TV, was officially launched on August 10, 2021 for both Latin America and Canada with which they would have a total coverage of 100 million people, in September they would expand to the European market being specifically Germany, Spain and Portugal On November 15, 2022, the launch of Azteca Now in Mexico was announced through the TV Azteca pay television channels, on November 16 it would be officially released for Android and iOS, it was launched mainly since the launch of Vix by TelevisaUnivision. on January 17, 2023 it was launched in the US market for the Hispanic market.

Programming

Telenovelas

Series

Movies

See also 

 Vix+
 Blim TV

References

External links 

 

TV Azteca
Android (operating system) software
IOS software
Entertainment companies established in 2021
Internet properties established in 2021
Mass media companies established in 2021
Mexican entertainment websites
Recommender systems
Video on demand services
Internet television streaming services
Video rental services
Mexican companies established in 2021
American companies established in 2021